Super Bug or Superbug may refer to:

 Superbug, an antimicrobial- or antibiotic-resistant microorganism
 Super Bug (video game), a 1977 arcade game featuring a Volkswagen Beetle
 Superbug (film series), a West German film series about a Volkswagen Beetle
 Volkswagen Super Bug, a nickname for the 1302/Super and 1303 models of the Volkswagen Beetle car
 Year 2038 problem,  a time formatting bug in computer systems also known as the Y2K38 Superbug.

See also
 Boeing F/A-18E/F Super Hornet